Hugglescote railway station is a disused railway station on the former Ashby and Nuneaton Joint Railway. It served the large village of Hugglescote where it joined the Leicester - Burton line and Charnwood Forest Railway. It closed in 1931 to passengers but closed to parcel traffic in 1951. Goods continued to pass through until 1965 when the line was closed from Coalville to Shackerstone. The site has since been demolished and is now overgrown. It was briefly used for a conveyor but this has since been removed.
The photograph shows the site of the station yard, the station was immediately behind this point of view.

References

External links
http://www.shackerstonefestival.co.uk/ANJR/Hhugglescote.htm

Disused railway stations in Leicestershire
Former Midland Railway stations
Former London and North Western Railway stations
Railway stations in Great Britain opened in 1873
Railway stations in Great Britain closed in 1931